Tatsumi Iida (飯田 健巳, born July 22, 1985) is a former Japanese football player who last played for Kataller Toyama.

Club statistics
Updated to 2 February 2018.

References

External links
Profile at Kataller Toyama

1985 births
Living people
Jobu University alumni
People from Zama, Kanagawa
Association football people from Kanagawa Prefecture
Japanese footballers
J2 League players
J3 League players
Japan Football League players
Tochigi SC players
Yokohama FC players
Kataller Toyama players
Association football goalkeepers